ACSW may refer to:

XM307 Advanced Crew Served Weapon
The Alberta College of Social Workers, both the designated regulatory body for the profession of social work and the professional association representing the interests of social workers in Alberta, Canada
Academy of Certified Social Workers, one of the credentials in psychology, issued by the National Association of Social Work